The 8th State Duma has 450 members. This sitting was elected at the 2021 Russian legislative election.

By constituencies

By party lists

Communist Party

United Russia

Liberal Democratic Party

A Just Russia — For Truth

New People

Notes

References 

Russia
8th
8th State Duma of the Russian Federation